Arjun Singh (born 2 April 1962) is an Indian politician and a Member of Parliament in the 17th Lok Sabha from Barrackpore Lok Sabha constituency in West Bengal. He contested the 2019 Indian general election as a BJP candidate and won against TMC candidate Dinesh Trivedi.

Previously, Singh had also won Bhatpara assembly seat consecutive four times since 2001 as a Trinamool Congress candidate. He has also been appointed one of the twelve Vice-Presidents of the West Bengal Unit of BJP on 1 June 2020.

On 22 May 2022, he rejoined Trinamool Congress.

Personal life 
Singh was born on 2 April 1962 in North 24 Parganas, Kolkata, West Bengal. His father, Satyanarayan Singh, was an active politician from INC and three term MLA from Bhatpara.

Arjun completed his schooling from Chashma-I-Rahamat High School. He joined Rishi Bankim Chandra Colleges at Naihati for graduation. He stopped his studies due to active involvement in politics. He also worked as Mazdoor Worker for a year in Jute Mills during his early days.

Political career 
Arjun Singh started his political journey by winning Bhatpara Municipality Election as councillor from Indian National Congress in 1995.

He later joined Trinamool Congress and contested state assembly election in 2001 as a Trinamool Congress candidate. He defeated his nearest candidate Ramprasad Kundu of CPI(M) and moved for the first time to state assembly. He has served Bhatpara Assembly since 2001.

Arjun Singh was also a candidate of All India Trinamool Congress from Barrackpore (Lok Sabha constituency) in the 2004 General Elections. but he lost to Tarit Baran Topdar of the Communist Party of India (Marxist).

He won his Bhatpara assembly seat consecutive four times since 2001 as Trinamool Congress candidate. Singh was the president of "Hindi wing" of Trinamool Congress. He was also the "State Incharge" of Uttar Pradesh, Bihar, Jharkhand, Punjab of Trinamool Congress, and is also the Chairman of Bhatpara municipality.

In March 2019, Singh joined Bharatiya Janata Party (BJP) and contested the 2019 Lok Sabha election from Barrackpore Parliamentary seat as a BJP candidate and won.

In May 2022, he raised the issue of closure of jute-mills in Barrackpore and after it he met Piyush Goyal, Textile Minister of India to solve the issue. According to him, the outcome of the meeting was not satisfiable as he expected. Following this he rejoined Trinamool Congress on 22 May.

Challenges
Singh won his Lok Sabha seat despite significant challenges. He claimed that many cases were made on him by ruling party TMC within the two months after joining BJP to allegedly harass him. Barrackpore Police tried to arrest him before Counting Day of the 2019 Indian general election. Singh appealed to the Supreme Court of India for relief and the court agreed. His house was also attacked with bombs and his car was also damaged by a TMC worker who threw stones, bombs and bricks. His son also had to face attacks in his car.
 
Even after the elections, the violence against Singh continued, his residence was attacked with seven rounds of fire and two bombs were hurled near his office and residence.
 
On 1 September 2019, Singh sustained a head injury during a clash between BJP and TMC supporters over control of party-office at Shyamnagar, which is under Jagatdal assembly constituency. He said that his car was vandalised by TMC cadres.
On 5 July 2020 once again he claimed that his car was vandalised By TMC Cadres at Halisahar, he was present in house of a BJP worker for virtual meeting preparation for JP Nadda. However, local TMC leader Subodh Adhikari denied the claim and said it was the BJP MP who instigated the attack.

The Supreme Court on Friday protected BJP leaders Arjun Singh, Kailash Vijayvargiya, Pawan Singh, Mukul Roy and Saurav Singh from any coercive steps to be taken by the West Bengal Police in FIRs registered against them which are pending investigation.

References

External links 
Arjun Singh – Lok Sabha Members Bioprofile

Living people
Bharatiya Janata Party politicians from West Bengal
1962 births
Members of the West Bengal Legislative Assembly
India MPs 2019–present